Polar Shift: A Benefit for Antarctica is a compilation album of new-age and ambient music, released in 1991. A project of the EarthSea Institute, a portion of its proceeds was pledged "to The Cousteau Society and other environmental organizations working to establish Antarctica as a Natural Reserve dedicated to peace and science." It featured 13 tracks (3 original and 10 already-released) from various artists, being in CD track list order: Yanni, Chris Spheeris, Constance Demby, Steve Howe, Paul Smith, Vangelis, Enya, Kitaro, Suzanne Ciani, John Tesh, and Jim Chappell. The compilation was co-produced by Anna Turner and Terence Yallop, and was released by Private Music on cassette and CD.

Track listing

Notes

References
 Polar Shift (full production credits and liner notes) via Archive.org

External links
 
 

1991 compilation albums
Private Music compilation albums
New-age compilation albums